David Franco Mendes (13 August 1713 – 10 October 1792), also known as David Ḥofshi, was a Dutch-Jewish Hebrew-language poet. He was an early member of the Haskalah in Holland.

Biography

A businessman, he devoted his leisure hours to the study of the Talmud, in which he became very proficient. He knew several languages and was especially well versed in Hebrew. For six months preceding his death he was honorary secretary of the Spanish-Portuguese community in Amsterdam.

David Franco Mendes was regarded as, next to Moses Hayyim Luzzatto and Naphtali Hirz Wessely, the most important Hebrew poet of his time. Delitzsch describes his poems as traditional in subject, national in spirit, and artistic in form. He followed Racine's Athalie in his historical drama Gemul 'Atalyah (Amsterdam, 1770; Vienna, 1800; Warsaw, 1860). Under the title Teshu'at Yisrael bi-Yede Yehudit (Rödelheim, 1840) he translated into Hebrew Pietro Metastasio's Betulia liberata. He was a frequent contributor to Ha-Meassef, in which he published some poems and short biographies of eminent Spanish-Portuguese Jewish. 

They include: Bi'at ha-Mashiaḥ, on the advent of the Messiah; Nir le-Dawid, responsa, several of which are printed in the collection Peri 'Eẓ Ḥayyim; a collection of Hebrew epitaphs; and Kinnor Dawid, a large collection of poems by him and others. His Memorias do Estabelecimento e Progresso dos Judeos Portuguezes e Espanhoes nesta Famosa Cidade de Amsterdam: Recapilados de Paneis Antigos Impressos e Escritos, no Ao. 5529 = 1769 (MS. no. 220, p. 4), Memorias Succintas da Consternaçaõ de Nosso K. K. de Amsterdam nos Tribulaçoõs desde Cidade e Provincia, no Ao. 1787 (MS. no. 34, p. 4), and Collecaõ de Antiguidades (manuscript) are of historical value.

References
 

1713 births
1792 deaths
Dutch male poets
Dutch people of Spanish-Jewish descent
Dutch Sephardi Jews
Hebrew-language poets
People of the Haskalah
Writers from Amsterdam